Bradia is a town in Fquih Ben Salah Province, Béni Mellal-Khénifra, Morocco. According to the 2004 census it has a population of 6,564.

References

Populated places in Fquih Ben Salah Province
Rural communes of Béni Mellal-Khénifra